Jeremy Turner may refer to:

Jeremy Turner (composer), American composer
Jeremy Turner (guitarist), guitarist for the American band Origin